Mark Mills may refer to:

Mark Muir Mills (1917–1958), American nuclear physicist
Mark Mills (writer), British novelist
Mark Mills (architect) (1921–2007), American experimental architect